The Blue Ridge dusky salamander (Desmognathus orestes) is a species of salamander in the family Plethodontidae.

Distribution
The species is endemic to the Blue Ridge Mountains range of the southern Appalachian Mountains, within western Virginia and North Carolina in the south-eastern United States.

Its natural habitats are temperate forests, rivers, intermittent rivers, freshwater springs, and rocky areas.

It is threatened by habitat loss.

Description
Their eggs are laid under logs or rocks.

References

External links
   IUCN Red List of Threatened Species

Desmognathus
Salamander, Blue Ridge
Ecology of the Appalachian Mountains
~
Taxonomy articles created by Polbot
Amphibians described in 1996